Rokautskyia microglazioui is a species of flowering plant in the family Bromeliaceae, endemic to Brazil (the state of Espírito Santo). It was first described in 1998 as Cryptanthus microglazioui. It is found in the Brazilian Atlantic Forest ecoregion.

References

microglazioui
Flora of Brazil
Plants described in 1998